Josiah Hinman Bonney (February 14, 1817 – September 12, 1887) was an American businessman and politician.

Born in Steuben County, New York, Bonney moved to Iowa Territory and eventually settled in Keosauqua, Van Buren County, Iowa Territory. Bonney was a merchant. He was elected the first sheriff of Van Buren County and was a Democrat. From 1843 to 1845, Bonney served in the Iowa Territorial Legislative Assembly. Bonney served as Iowa Secretary of State from 1848 to 1850.

Notes

1817 births
1887 deaths
People from Steuben County, New York
People from Keosauqua, Iowa
Businesspeople from Iowa
Iowa Democrats
Iowa sheriffs
Members of the Iowa Territorial Legislature
Secretaries of State of Iowa
19th-century American politicians
19th-century American businesspeople